Frondihabitans australicus is a Gram-positive and aerobic bacterium from the genus Frondihabitans which has been isolated from leaf litters from Southeast Queensland in Australia.

References

Microbacteriaceae
Bacteria described in 2007